Cyathocoma is a genus of flowering plants belonging to the family Cyperaceae.

Its native range is Southern Africa.

Species:

Cyathocoma bachmannii 
Cyathocoma ecklonii 
Cyathocoma hexandra

References

Cyperaceae
Cyperaceae genera